is a Japanese jazz pianist and composer, born in Kiryū, Gunma Prefecture. As of 2012, she was based in New York City. She has had more than a dozen albums as a leader, most of them being released by Verve Records.

Career

Yamanaka studied at the Berklee College of Music and is an alumna of the Betty Carter's Jazz Ahead residency program. She has played and recorded with the New York-based DIVA Jazz Orchestra, led by Sherrie Maricle, but is best known for her small group recordings, which are typically trios and have featured bassists such as Larry Grenadier and Robert Hurst, and drummers such as Jeff Ballard and Jeff "Tain" Watts.

Yamanaka has toured in Europe, the United States and Japan, and has played at several festivals, including the Umbria Jazz Festival  in 2011 (a performance described by the Jazz Times' reviewer as "The biggest surprise of the night [...] Right and left, jaws were dropping", and the Bologna Jazz Festival and Mary Lou Williams Women in Jazz Festival the following year. In 2011 and 2012 Yamanaka played Gershwin's Rhapsody in Blue with symphony orchestras in Japan.

Yamanaka has more than a dozen recordings released under her own name, principally on the Verve label, most of which have been released internationally, and which include a DVD of her playing at the Iridium Jazz Club in New York. Two of her recent releases, Forever Begins (2010) and Reminiscence (2011), were given four-star ratings by AllMusic reviewers, the review of the latter concluding with, "Yamanaka is a fierce talent with robust chops, plenty of soul, and a seemingly endless imagination for the musical possibilities of the piano trio".

Yamanaka is one of the 'Frontier Ambassadors' for Kōriyama City.

Playing style
John Fordham commented in 2016 that Yamanaka played, in the nature of Oscar Peterson, "straightahead classic jazz with the kind of showboating virtuosity that makes listeners doubt their senses". "Like Peterson, Yamanaka favours opening a song at a quiet, lounge-jazz sway and winding it up to a sprint just as listeners are settling back in their chairs."

Discography

As leader

Others 
With Sherrie Maricle & The Diva Jazz Orchestra
 A Tommy Newsom Tribute (Lightyear Entertainment, 2005)

With Marlene VerPlanck
 It's How You Play the Game (Audiophile, 2004)

References

External links

Chihiro Yamanaka Official Site (mainly in Japanese)
AllMusic pages

Berklee College of Music alumni
Japanese jazz pianists
Japanese women pianists
Living people
Musicians from Gunma Prefecture
Musicians from New York City
People from Gunma Prefecture
21st-century pianists
21st-century American women musicians
Year of birth missing (living people)
21st-century women pianists